Alfred Knopf may refer to:
Alfred A. Knopf Sr. (1892–1984), founder of Alfred A. Knopf, Inc., the publishing company
Alfred A. Knopf Jr. (1918–2009), son of Alfred A. Knopf, Sr.
Alfred A. Knopf or Knopf Publishing Group, subsidiary of Random House